Sonali is a popular Indian female given name.

Persons 
 Sonali Bendre (born 1975), Indian actress
 Shonali Bose (born 1965), Indian filmmaker
 Shonali Bhowmik (born 20th century), Indian-American musician
 Sonali Chakravarti Banerjee, Indian academician
 Sonali Chowdhury, Indian actress
 Sonali De Rycker, British-Indian venture capitalist 
 Sonali Dev (born 1972), Indian American novelist
 Sonali Guha (born 1968), Indian politician
 Sonali Gulati, Indian-American filmmaker
 Sonali Khare (born 1982), Indian actress
 Sonali Kulkarni, Indian actress
 Sonali Kulkarni (businesswoman) (born 1965), Indian businesswoman
 Sonalee Kulkarni (born 1988), Indian actress
 Sonali Majumdar (born 2005), Indian salsa dancer
 Sonali Mukherjee (born 1985), Indian acid-attack victim
 Shonali Nagrani (born 1981), Indian actress
 Sonali Naik, Indian actress
 Sonali Nikam, Indian actress
 Sonali Rao (born 1997), Indo-Fijian footballer
 Sunali Rathod, Indian singer
 Sonali Rastogi (born 1954), Indian architect
 Sonali Raut (born 1990), Indian actress
 Sonali Sachdev (born 1965), Indian actress
 Sonali Shah, British-Indian presenter and newsreader
 Sonali Verma, Indian actress
 Sonali Vishnu Shingate (born 1995), Indian Kabaddi player 
 Indu Sonali (born 1980), Indian singer

See also 
 Sonal
 Sonali Bank, bank in Bangladesh
 Sonali Bag
 Sonali Cable, 2014 Indian drama film by Charudutt Acharya

Indian feminine given names